Joe or Joseph Bolton may refer to:

Joseph Cheney Bolton (1819–1901), Scottish Member of Parliament for Stirlingshire, 1880–1892
Joseph Shaw Bolton (1867–1946), English physician, pathologist, neurologist and professor of mental diseases
Joe Bolton (television personality) (1910–1986), American children's host ("Officer Joe") in New York City from 1948 to 1975
Joe Bolton (footballer) (born 1955), English left full-back
Joe Bolton (poet) (1961–1990), American author of three books

See also
Bolton (disambiguation)